Joseph Verbis Lafleur (January 24, 1912 – September 7, 1944) was a Roman Catholic priest of the Military Ordinariate of the United States  who died in the sinking of the  and is in the preliminary stages for sainthood.

Early life
Lafleur was born in 1912 and grew up in rural Louisiana as one of seven children. His father abandoned his family and left his mother to raise their seven children. The mother took odd jobs and grew a garden to feed the impoverished family.

Military service
Lafleur volunteered to serve in the U.S. Army prior to World War II and was serving as a chaplain in the Army Air Corps at Clark Field, the Corps’ post in the Philippines when war broke out.  He refused evacuation to safety and stayed with the soldiers under his care.  He was captured in May 1942 and spent two years in several Japanese prisoner of war camps ministering to his fellow captives. In September 1944, he and 750 other U.S. military personnel were placed on a ship to take them to the Japanese homeland.  A U.S. submarine attacked the convoy and torpedoed the ship carrying U.S. personnel.

Military awards
As a military chaplain of the U.S. Army, Lafleur received the following awards for heroism:

 Distinguished Service Cross  awarded in 1942.

Citation:

"The President of the United States of America, authorized by Act of Congress, July 9, 1918, takes pleasure in presenting the Distinguished Service Cross to First Lieutenant (Chaplain) Joseph Verbis LaFleur (ASN: 0-413997), United States Army Air Forces, for extraordinary heroism in connection with military operations against an armed enemy while serving as Chaplain in Headquarters Squadron, 19th Bombardment Group (H), FIFTH Air Force, in action against enemy forces during the first Japanese attack on a Philippine Island airport on 8 December 1941. Chaplain LaFleur worked among the wounded, removing them to safety, and comforting the dying. First Lieutenant LaFleur's intrepid actions, personal bravery and zealous devotion to duty exemplify the highest traditions of the military forces of the United States and reflect great credit upon himself, the 5th Air Force and the United States Army Air Forces."

 Distinguished Service Cross awarded in 2017.

Citation:

"The President of the United States of America, authorized by Act of Congress July 9, 1918, takes pride in presenting a Bronze Oak Leaf Cluster in lieu of a Second Award of the Distinguished Service Cross (Posthumously) to First Lieutenant (Chaplain) Joseph Verbis LaFleur (ASN: 0-413997), United States Army Air Forces, for extraordinary heroism from 30 December 1941 through 7 September 1944. While evading capture aboard the S.S. MAYTON, Chaplain LaFleur was instrumental in saving three men who jumped overboard during an attack from a Japanese bomber. After the three men were rescued, he then assisted Soldiers into lifeboats until he was the last man on the ship, denying his own chance to escape to Australia. As a Prisoner of War after 1 January 1942, Chaplain LaFleur constructed a chapel at the prison camp to minister to men of all faiths. He continuously advocated for food and medicine for the prisoners often intervening on their behalf, resulting in beatings at the hands of his captors. Later, while aboard the "hell ship" SHINYO MARU bound for Japan, he organized distribution of the meager rations allotted to approximately 400 prisoners and was observed giving his rations to others. On 7 September 1944, the submarine U.S.S. PADDLE, believing the ship was transporting Japanese Soldiers, sank the SHINYO MARU. Chaplain LaFleur was last seen aiding prisoners to escape in spite of Japanese guards firing small arms weapons and throwing hand grenades into the ship's hold. Chaplain LaFleur's personal valor and self-sacrifice in the face of grave danger are in keeping with the highest traditions of military service and reflect great credit upon himself and the Army of the United States."

 Bronze Star Medal

Cause of beatification
On September 5, 2020, the Roman Catholic Diocese of Lafayette in Louisiana, led by Bishop John Douglas Deshotel, officially opened the cause for his beatification. He is the third candidate for canonization from the Lafayette Diocese, following Auguste Nonco Pelafigue (1888–1977), a layman, and Charlene Richard (1947–1959), a young girl. Pelafigue and Richard's case for sainthood was opened on January the same year.

On June 16, 2021, Archbishop Broglio voiced his support in the cause for the canonization of Father Joseph Verbis Lafleur, saying he hopes it "meets with rapid success!"

References

Further reading
 Guerra, S. D., Guerra, P. J. (2010). But He Dies Not: The Life of Father Joseph Verbis Lafleur, Priest—military Chaplain. United States: Andrepont Printing.
 Delery, E. L. (1991). The Roses Have Crossed to the Other Side of the Wall: The Story of Heroic U.S. Army Air Corps Chaplain Joseph Verbis Lafleur, Recipient of the Distinguished Service Cross, Bronze Star Medal, and Purple Heart. United States: Edna L. Delery.
 Roper, R. S. (2003). Brothers of Paul: Activities of Prisoner of War Chaplains in the Philippines During WWII. United States: Revere Printing.

1912 births
1944 deaths
American Servants of God
20th-century venerated Christians
United States military chaplaincy
United States Army Air Forces personnel killed in World War II
World War II chaplains
Recipients of the Distinguished Service Cross (United States)
People from Ville Platte, Louisiana
People from St. Landry Parish, Louisiana
People from Opelousas, Louisiana
20th-century American Roman Catholic priests
United States Army Air Forces officers